The DARPA Grand Challenge is a prize competition for American autonomous vehicles, funded by the Defense Advanced Research Projects Agency, the most prominent research organization of the United States Department of Defense. Congress has authorized DARPA to award cash prizes to further DARPA's mission to sponsor revolutionary, high-payoff research that bridges the gap between fundamental discoveries and military use. The initial DARPA Grand Challenge was created to spur the development of technologies needed to create the first fully autonomous ground vehicles capable of completing a substantial off-road course within a limited time. The third event, the DARPA Urban Challenge extended the initial Challenge to autonomous operation in a mock urban environment.  A more recent Challenge, the 2012 DARPA Robotics Challenge, focused on autonomous emergency-maintenance robots, and new Challenges are still being conceived.

The first competition of the DARPA Grand Challenge was held on March 13, 2004 in the Mojave Desert region of the United States, along a 150-mile (240 km) route that follows along the path of Interstate 15 from just before Barstow, California to just past the California–Nevada border in Primm. None of the robot vehicles finished the route. Carnegie Mellon University's Red Team and car Sandstorm (a converted Humvee) traveled the farthest distance, completing 11.78 km (7.32 mi) of the course before getting hung up on a rock after making a switchback turn. No winner was declared, and the cash prize was not given. Therefore, a second DARPA Grand Challenge event was scheduled for 2005.

History and background

Fully autonomous vehicles have been an international pursuit for many years, from endeavors in Japan (starting in 1977), Germany (Ernst Dickmanns and VaMP), Italy (the ARGO Project), the European Union (EUREKA Prometheus Project), the United States of America, and other countries. DARPA funded the development of the first fully autonomous robot beginning in 1966 with the Shakey the robot project at Stanford Research Institute, now SRI International. The first autonomous ground vehicle capable of driving on and off roads was developed by DARPA as part of the Strategic Computing Initiative beginning in 1984 leading to demonstrations of autonomous navigation by the Autonomous Land Vehicle and the Navlab.

The Grand Challenge was the first long distance competition for driverless cars in the world; other research efforts in the field of driverless cars take a more traditional commercial or academic approach. The U.S. Congress authorized DARPA to offer prize money ($1 million) for the first Grand Challenge to facilitate robotic development, with the ultimate goal of making one-third of ground military forces autonomous by 2015. Following the 2004 event, Dr. Tony Tether, the director of DARPA, announced that the prize money had been increased to $2 million for the next event, which was claimed on October 9, 2005. The first, second and third places in the 2007 Urban Challenge received $2 million, $1 million, and $500,000, respectively. 14 new teams have qualified in year 2019.

The competition was open to teams and organizations from around the world, as long as there was at least one U.S. citizen on the roster. Teams have participated from high schools, universities, businesses and other organizations. More than 100 teams registered in the first year, bringing a wide variety of technological skills to the race. In the second year, 195 teams from 36 U.S. states and 4 foreign countries entered the race.

2004 Grand Challenge

The first competition of the DARPA Grand Challenge was held on March 13, 2004 in the Mojave Desert region of the United States, along a  route that follows along the path of Interstate 15 from just before Barstow, California to just past the California–Nevada border in Primm.
None of the robot vehicles finished the route. Carnegie Mellon University's Red Team and car Sandstorm (a converted Humvee) traveled the farthest distance, completing  of the course before getting hung up on a rock after making a switchback turn. No winner was declared, and the cash prize was not given. Therefore, a second DARPA Grand Challenge event was scheduled for 2005.

2005 Grand Challenge

The second competition of the DARPA Grand Challenge began at 6:40 am on October 8, 2005. All but one of the 23 finalists in the 2005 race surpassed the  distance completed by the best vehicle in the 2004 race.  Five vehicles successfully completed the 212 km (132 mi) course:

Vehicles in the 2005 race passed through three narrow tunnels and negotiated more than 100 sharp left and right turns.  The race concluded through Beer Bottle Pass, a winding mountain pass with a sheer drop-off on one side and a rock face on the other.  Although the 2004 course required more elevation gain and some very sharp switchbacks (Daggett Ridge) were required near the beginning of the route, the course had far fewer curves and generally wider roads than the 2005 course.

The natural rivalry between the teams from Stanford and Carnegie Mellon (Sebastian Thrun, head of the Stanford team was previously a faculty member at Carnegie Mellon and colleague of Red Whittaker, head of the CMU team) was played out during the race.  Mechanical problems plagued H1ghlander before it was passed by Stanley.  Gray Team's entry was a miracle in itself, as the team from the suburbs of New Orleans was caught in Hurricane Katrina a few short weeks before the race.  The fifth finisher, Terramax, a 30,000 pound entry from Oshkosh Truck, finished on the second day.  The huge truck spent the night idling on the course, but was particularly nimble in carefully picking its way down the narrow roads of Beer Bottle Pass.

2007 Urban Challenge

The third competition of the DARPA Grand Challenge, known as the "Urban Challenge", took place on November 3, 2007 at the site of the now-closed George Air Force Base (currently used as Southern California Logistics Airport), in Victorville, California (Google map). The course involved a  urban area course, to be completed in less than 6 hours.  Rules included obeying all traffic regulations while negotiating with other traffic and obstacles and merging into traffic.

Unlike previous challenges, the 2007 Urban Challenge organizers divided competitors into two "tracks", A and B. All Track A and Track B teams were part of the same competition circuit, but the teams chosen for the Track A program received US $1 million in funding. These 11 teams largely represented major universities and large corporate interests such as CMU teaming with GM as Tartan Racing, Stanford teaming with Volkswagen, Virginia Tech teaming with TORC Robotics as VictorTango, Oshkosh Truck, Honeywell, Raytheon, Caltech, Autonomous Solutions, Cornell, and MIT. One of the few independent entries in Track A was  the Golem Group. DARPA has not publicly explained the rationale behind the selection of Track A teams.

Teams were given maps sparsely charting the waypoints that defined the competition courses. At least one team, Tartan Racing, enhanced the maps through the insertion of additional extrapolated waypoints for improved navigation. A debriefing paper published by Team Jefferson illustrates graphically the contrast between the course map it was given by DARPA and the course map used by Tartan Racing.

Tartan Racing claimed the $2 million prize with their vehicle "Boss", a Chevy Tahoe.  The second-place finisher earning the $1 million prize was the Stanford Racing Team with their entry "Junior", a 2006 Volkswagen Passat.  Coming in third place was team VictorTango, winning the $500,000 prize with their 2005 Ford Escape hybrid, "Odin". MIT placed 4th, with Cornell University and University of Pennsylvania/Lehigh University also completing the course.

The six teams that successfully finished the entire course:

While the 2004 and 2005 events were more physically challenging for the vehicles, the robots operated in isolation and only encountered other vehicles on the course when attempting to pass.  The Urban Challenge required designers to build vehicles able to obey all traffic laws while they detect and avoid other robots on the course.  This is a particular challenge for vehicle software, as vehicles must make "intelligent" decisions in real time based on the actions of other vehicles. Other than previous autonomous vehicle efforts that focused on structured situations such as highway driving with little interaction between the vehicles, this competition operated in a more cluttered urban environment and required the cars to perform sophisticated interactions with each other, such as maintaining precedence at a 4-way stop intersection.

2012 Robotics Challenge

The DARPA Robotics Challenge is an ongoing competition focusing on humanoid robotics. The primary goal of the program is to develop ground robotic capabilities to execute complex tasks in dangerous, degraded, human-engineered environments. It launched in October 2012, and hosted the Virtual Robotics Competition in June 2013. Two more competitions are planned: the DRC Trials in December 2013, and the DRC Finals in December 2014.

Unlike prior Challenges, the construction of the "vehicles" will not be part of the scope of the Robotics Challenge.  In August 2012 DARPA announced Boston Dynamics would act as sole source for the robots to be used in the challenge, awarding them a contract to develop and build 8 identical robots based on the PETMAN project for the software teams to use. The amount contracted was $10,882,438 cost-plus-fixed-fee contract and work is expected to be completed by Aug. 9, 2014.

2013 FANG Challenge
On April 22, 2013, DARPA awarded a $1 million prize to "Ground Systems", a 3-person team with members in Ohio, Texas and California, as the winner of the Fast Adaptable Next-Generation Ground Vehicle (FANG) Mobility/Drivetrain Challenge.  Team Ground Systems' final design submission received the highest score when measured against the established requirements for system performance and manufacturability. Since the beginning of the first FANG Challenge on January 14, 2013, more than 1,000 participants within more than 200 teams used the META design tools and the VehicleFORGE collaboration platform developed by Vanderbilt University in Nashville, Tennessee, to design and simulate the performance of thousands of potential mobility and drivetrain subsystems. The goal of the FANG program is to test the specially developed META design tools, model libraries and the VehicleFORGE platform, which were created to significantly compress the design-to-production time of a complex defense system.

2017–2021 Subterranean Challenge

The DARPA Subterranean Challenge tasks teams, consisting of university and corporate entities from around the world, to build robotic systems and virtual solutions to autonomously map, navigate, and search  subterranean environments. These environments pose significant challenges to competitors, including a lack of lighting, lack of GPS capabilities, dripping water, thick smoke, and cluttered or irregularly shaped environments. The challenge started in September 2018 and consists of a Systems Competition (in which teams compete with physical robots) and a Virtual Competition (in which teams compete in a virtual environment in the ROS Gazebo virtual simulator). The competition is split into three stages (Development Stage, Circuit Stage, and Finals Stage. The SubT Challenge consists of four events, he Tunnel Circuit (August 2019), which was held at an experimental mine in Pittsburgh, PA; the Urban Circuit (February 2020), which features an abandoned nuclear power plant in Elma, WA; the Cave Circuit (November 2020), which was held virtual only due to the COVID-19 Pandemic; and the Final Event (September 2021), which will feature elements from all three domains (tunnel urban underground, and natural cave networks will be held in Louisville, KY. On September 24, 2021, DARPA will award a $2 million prize to the winner of the Systems Competition and $1.5 million to the winner of the Virtual Competition.

2018 Launch Challenge

In early 2020, three teams were expected to compete by rapidly launching a small satellite payload into orbit, with minimal notification, from two different launch sites (this requirement was later, when there was only one competitor left in the Challenge, relaxed so that the launches should use different launch pads, but could use the same launch site) – one just days after the other – for an opportunity to win prizes. The prizes of the Challenge are: All teams that qualify for the competition would receive $400,000. Each team to successfully carry out an orbital launch gets a prize of $2 million, and is eligible to try to make a second launch in rapid succession. The second launches of the teams are scored (based on combination of time to launch, mass launched and orbital accuracy, etc.); the winning team gets $10 million, second prize is $9 million, and third prize $8 million. The pool of launch sites for the Challenge originally consisted of 8 launch locations; in the end, only Pacific Spaceport Complex – Alaska was used for an attempted launch.

The Challenge was announced on 18 April 2018, and on 10 April 2019, three finalist teams who would be attempting to launch rockets were announced: Virgin Orbit, Vector Launch and Astra (although at the time it was not published that the third finalist was Astra; the company was referred only as a "stealth startup"). In the autumn of 2019, both Vector and Virgin dropped out of the competition, Vector because of financial problems and Virgin because it wanted to focus on other customers than DARPA. The final remaining team, Astra, attempted to launch their Astra Rocket 3.0 for the Challenge from Pacific Spaceport Complex – Alaska in late February and early March 2020, but several launch attempts were all called off due to weather and technical difficulties. With the only team left in the competition failing to launch their rocket in the time frame set by DARPA, the Challenge was called off 2 March 2020 with no winner of the DARPA Launch Challenge. The $12 million prize pool went unclaimed. No rocket launch was performed by any contender of the DARPA Launch Challenge.

2022 Triage Challenge
The DARPA Triage Challenge (DTC) will use a series of challenge events to spur development of novel physiological features for medical triage. The DTC aims to drive breakthrough innovations in identification of “signatures” of injury that will help medical responders perform scalable, timely, and accurate triage. It is a 3-year challenge with prize money of $7 million.

The Challenge was announced on 16 November 2022.

Technology

A technology paper and source code for the computer vision machine learning component of the 2005 Stanford entry has been published.

2007 Urban Challenge teams employed a variety of different software and hardware combinations for interpreting sensor data, planning, and execution.  Some examples:

See also

ARPA-E (energy)
Centennial Challenges
Driverless car
Multi Autonomous Ground-robotic International Challenge
European Land - Robot Trial
General Motors EN-V
Global Security Challenge
Google driverless car
List of challenge awards
MIT Media Lab CityCar
Robot competition
VisLab Intercontinental Autonomous Challenge

References

External links

Announcement of the 2007 Grand Challenge (PDF)
 DARPA Cyber Grand Challenge

Press coverage

 The Register: Final robot grunts picked for $1million DARPA race
 The Register: DARPA's Grand Challenge proves to be too grand
 CNN.com: Robots fail to complete Grand Challenge
 SFGate.com: Robot race suffers quick, ignoble end
 2004 DARPA Grand Challenge Image Gallery
 IEEE Computer Society, Special Issue on Unmanned Vehicles: The DARPA Grand Challenge
 Journal of Field Robotics, Special Issue on DARPA Grand Challenge, Part 1
 Journal of Field Robotics, Special Issue on DARPA Grand Challenge, Part 2
 Wired Magazine article on the DARPA Grand Challenge and Stanley.
 Popular Mechanics article on the DARPA Grand Challenge.
 Popular Mechanics article on the UK MoD Grand Challenge
 Popular Science article on the DARPA Grand Challenge.
 Scientific American article on the DARPA Grand Challenge.

 Forbes article on the DARPA Cyber Grand Challenge competition
 Engadget article on the DARPA Cyber Grand Challenge competition